Selama Mint Cheikhne Ould Lemrabott (born in 1973) is a minister in the government of Mauritania.

References

Living people
Mauritanian politicians
1973 births
Date of birth missing (living people)